Kawardha is a town and a municipality in Kabirdham district in the Indian state of Chhattisgarh. It is the administrative headquarters of Kabirdham district. Kawardha is also known for the "Temple of Bhoramdeo."

The Member of Legislative assembly from Kawardha is Mohammed Akbar of Congress. He is also a cabinet minister in Chhattisgarh government. The collector of Kawardha is Shri Janmejay Mahobe (I.A.S.).

History
Kawardha State was established in 1751 by first Ruler Mahabali Singh. During the British Raj, Kawardha was the capital of Kawardha State, one of the princely states of the  Eastern States Agency. In 1806 the Eighth Guru of Kabeer panth Haq Nam Saheb established a Guru Gaddi here. In 1936 Kawardha town became a municipality before independence. The famous Bhoramdev Temple is in the town.

Geography
The state consists of hill and forest.

Demographics
At the 2011 India census, Kawardha had a population of 44,205. Males constitute 52% of the population and females 48%. Kawardha has an average literacy rate of 66%, higher than the national average of 59.5%: male literacy is 76%, and female literacy is 55%. In Kawardha, 15% of the population is under 6 years of age.

Web portals 
Internet penetration is gaining pace in Kawardha.

Villages
 

Ramehpur

References
Dr. Sanjay Alung-Chhattisgarh ki Riyaste/Princely stastes aur Jamindariyaa (Vaibhav Prakashan, Raipur1)
Dr.Sanjay Alung-Chhattisgarh ki Janjaatiyaa/Tribes aur Jatiyaa/Castes (Mansi publication, Delhi6)

Cities and towns in Kabirdham
Former capital cities in India